Retusin is an O-methylated isoflavone, a type of flavonoid. It can be found in Fabaceae species like Dipteryx odorata, in Dalbergia retusa and in Millettia nitida. It can also be found in Maackia amurensis cell cultures.

References 

O-methylated isoflavones
Catechols